The Mazari cap or Pashteen hat is a red-and-black-patterned hat originating from the Mazar-i-Sharif city of Afghanistan, worn across Afghanistan and parts of Pakistan.

Originally associated with the Hazaras, Uzbeks, Turkmens and Tajiks of Afghanistan, the hat gained widespread popularity among the Pashtuns after 2018 because of the rise to prominence of Manzoor Ahmad Pashteen, the leader of the Pashtun Tahafuz Movement (PTM), who usually wears it. The hat became a symbol of PTM, Afghan nationalism and Pashtun nationalism.

See also
 Pakol
 Tubeteika
 Doppa (Uzbek hat)
 Taqiyah (topi cap)
 Karakul (Jinnah cap)
 Chapan
 Peshawari turban

References

Hats
Pashtun culture
Hazaragi culture
Afghan clothing
Pakistani headgear
Pashtun Tahafuz Movement